Maksym Ilyuk (born 10 November 1990) is a Ukrainian footballer currently playing as a striker.

Career
Ilyuk's first trainer was V. Buzhak. Maksym was top scorer of FC Bukovyna Chernivtsi during the 2007–08 season in the Ukrainian Second League.

References

External links

Living people
1990 births
FC Bukovyna Chernivtsi players
FC Shakhtar-3 Donetsk players
FC Zorya Luhansk players
FC Mariupol players
Ukrainian Premier League players
Ukrainian footballers
Association football forwards